Queenzieburn is a small settlement in the historic county of Stirlingshire and the Council Area of North Lanarkshire, Scotland. Its estimated population is 520. It is located near the town of Kilsyth and has a small industrial estate. The village has one school called Chapelgreen Primary. Senior pupils usually attend Kilsyth Academy.

Etymology
Queenzieburn is pronounced . This is due to the original Scots spelling, Queenȝieburn, containing the letter yogh, which was later erroneously confused with the tailed z. The meaning may be "stream, of the wedge place".

Notable residents
Entertainer Janette Tough who, along with her husband Ian, make up the comedy duo the Krankies, grew up in Queenzieburn.

References

External links

Gazetteer for Scotland

Villages in North Lanarkshire